In classical antiquity, the cornucopia, from Latin cornu (horn) and copia (abundance), also called the horn of plenty, was a symbol of abundance and nourishment, commonly a large horn-shaped container overflowing with produce, flowers, or nuts.

Baskets or panniers of this form were traditionally used in western Asia and Europe to hold and carry newly harvested food products. The horn-shaped basket would be worn on the back or slung around the torso, leaving the harvester's hands free for picking.

In Greek/Roman mythology

Mythology offers multiple explanations of the origin of the cornucopia. One of the best-known involves the birth and nurturance of the infant Zeus, who had to be hidden from his devouring father Cronus. In a cave on Mount Ida on the island of Crete, baby Zeus was cared for and protected by a number of divine attendants, including the goat Amaltheia ("Nourishing Goddess"), who fed him with her milk. The suckling future king of the gods had unusual abilities and strength, and in playing with his nursemaid accidentally broke off one of her horns, which then had the divine power to provide unending nourishment, as the foster mother had to the god.

In another myth, the cornucopia was created when Heracles (Roman Hercules) wrestled with the river god Achelous and ripped off one of his horns; river gods were sometimes depicted as horned. This version is represented in the Achelous and Hercules mural painting by the American Regionalist artist Thomas Hart Benton.

The cornucopia became the attribute of several Greek and Roman deities, particularly those associated with the harvest, prosperity, or spiritual abundance, such as personifications of Earth (Gaia or Terra); the child Plutus, god of riches and son of the grain goddess Demeter; the nymph Maia; and Fortuna, the goddess of luck, who had the power to grant prosperity. In Roman Imperial cult, abstract Roman deities who fostered peace (pax Romana) and prosperity were also depicted with a cornucopia, including Abundantia, "Abundance" personified, and Annona, goddess of the grain supply to the city of Rome. Hades, the classical ruler of the underworld in the mystery religions, was a giver of agricultural, mineral and spiritual wealth, and in art often holds a cornucopia.

Modern depictions
In modern depictions, the cornucopia is typically a hollow, horn-shaped wicker basket filled with various kinds of festive fruit and vegetables. In most of North America, the cornucopia has come to be associated with Thanksgiving and the harvest.  Cornucopia is also the name of the annual November Food and Wine celebration in Whistler, British Columbia, Canada.  Two cornucopias are seen in the flag and state seal of Idaho.  The Great Seal of North Carolina depicts Liberty standing and Plenty holding a cornucopia.  The coats of arms of Colombia, Panama, Peru and Venezuela, and the coat of arms of the state of Victoria, Australia, also feature the cornucopia, symbolizing prosperity.

In Terry Pratchett's Discworld series of fantasy novels, the witch Tiffany Aching was briefly in possession of the Cornucopia which is badge of office of Summer, when she contracted avatarism as well as ped fecundis during the events of Wintersmith. This causes problems by spurting out food and animals, including a massive flock of chickens.

The motif of the cornucopia is used in the book series The Hunger Games. In the eponymous gladiatorial games described in the series, a large horn-like cache filled with weapons and equipment is placed at the starting point: this cache serves as the focal point of fighting during the games' first minutes, and is even called the "Cornucopia". In the film adaptation, the national anthem of Panem, the series' primary setting, is called "the Horn of Plenty", which is mentioned several times in the lyrics.

The horn of plenty is used for body art and at Thanksgiving, as it is a symbol of fertility, fortune and abundance.

Gallery

See also

 Akshaya Patra
 Chalice of Doña Urraca
 Cup of Jamshid
 Drinking horn
 Holy Chalice
 Holy Grail
 List of mythological objects
 Nanteos Cup
 Relic
 Sampo
 Venus of Laussel
 Śarīra
 Cintamani
 Mani stone
 Ashtamangala
 Yasakani no Magatama
 Kaustubha Gem
 Luminous gemstones
 Philosopher's stone
 Sendai Daikannon statue
 Syamantaka Gem
 Eight Treasures
 Cornucopian

References

External links

Containers
Food storage containers
Greek mythology
Heraldic charges
Roman mythology
Symbols
Thanksgiving
Mythological objects
Visual motifs
Ornaments
Ornaments (architecture)
Magic items